Disodium inosinate (E631) is the disodium salt of inosinic acid with the chemical formula C10H11N4Na2O8P.  It is used as a food additive and often found in instant noodles, potato chips, and a variety of other snacks. Although it can be obtained from bacterial fermentation of sugars, it is often commercially prepared from animal products.

Use as a food additive
Disodium inosinate is used as a flavor enhancer, in synergy with monosodium glutamate (MSG) to provide the umami taste. It is often added to foods in conjunction with disodium guanylate; the combination is known as disodium 5′-ribonucleotides.

As a relatively expensive product, disodium inosinate is usually not used independently of glutamic acid; if disodium inosinate is present in a list of ingredients, but MSG does not appear to be, it is possible that glutamic acid is provided as part of another ingredient or is naturally occurring in another ingredient like tomatoes, Parmesan cheese, or yeast extract.

Origin
Disodium inosinate is generally produced from meat, including pig fat. Though it is normally a non-vegetarian product, it also may be produced from tapioca starch without any animal products involved in the production. The producer can provide information on the origin and it is in some cases labeled as "vegetarian" in ingredients lists when produced from plant sources.

Toxicology and safety 
In the United States, consumption of added 5′-ribonucleotides averages 4 mg per day, compared to 2 g per day of naturally occurring purines. A review of literature by an FDA committee found no evidence of carcinogenicity, teratogenicity, or adverse effects on reproduction.

In 2004, disodium inosinate was removed from the food additive list by Codex Alimentarius Commission (but it is still mentioned on the last (2009) codex alimentarius list).

See also

References 

Food additives
Nucleotides
Organic sodium salts
Flavor enhancers
Umami enhancers
E-number additives